Lists of Czech and Slovak films include:

 List of Czechoslovak films, films made in Czechoslovakia, a state that existed 1918–1992
 Lists of Czech films, films made in Czech lands from 1898 to present
 List of Slovak films, films made in Slovak lands from 1897 to present

Czech and Slovak films
Czech and Slovak films